Kimberly Pate may refer to:

 Kim Pate, executive director of the Canadian Association of Elizabeth Fry Societies and Member of the Order of Canada
 K. Michelle, American R&B singer and songwriter